Avellaneda Department is a department of Argentina in Santiago del Estero Province. The capital city of the department is situated in Herrera.

Districts 

 Caloj
 Percas
 Punta Corral
 Cejas
 Gramilla
 Bracho
 Banda
 Mailín
 Mancapa
 Puyana
 Icaño
 Taco Atun
 San José

Notable people
 Agustina Palacio de Libarona (1825-1880), writer, storyteller; also known as "La Heroína del Bracho"

References

Departments of Santiago del Estero Province